Chesbro may refer to:

Surname:
George C. Chesbro, American author
Jack Chesbro, baseball player
Tommy Chesbro, wrestler and coach
Wesley Chesbro, a politician

Place:
Chesbro Reservoir

Business:
Chesbro Music Company